Events in the year 1916 in Spain.

Incumbents
Monarch: Alfonso XIII
President of the Government: Álvaro de Figueroa, 1st Count of Romanones

Births
 May 11 - Camilo José Cela, author (d. 2002)

Deaths

March 7 - José Ferrer, guitarist and composer (b. 1835)
March 24 - Enrique Granados, composer (b. 1867)

References

 
Years of the 20th century in Spain
1910s in Spain
Spain
Spain